Jordan Lee Williams (born 22 October 1999) is an English professional footballer who plays as a right back for League One club Barnsley.

A product of the Huddersfield Town Academy, he was loaned out to Bury in August 2017, just 2 days after making his debut in the League Cup against Rotherham United.

Career
Brought up in Huddersfield, Williams joined Huddersfield Town aged 9, and gradually went up the ranks, including winning two England under-18 caps.

He made his competitive first team debut for the Terriers in their EFL Cup second round match against Rotherham United at the John Smith's Stadium on 23 August 2017.

After head coach David Wagner said he expected Williams to go out on loan to gain experience, he joined EFL League One side Bury on loan for the rest of the season on 25 August 2017. He made his debut for the Shakers the following day in their 0–0 draw against Rochdale.

On 8 August 2018, Williams joined League One club Barnsley for an undisclosed fee, signing a four-year deal. He scored his first goal for Barnsley, and his first career goal, in an EFL Trophy tie against Manchester City Under-23s on 4 December 2018.

Career statistics

Honours

Club
Barnsley
EFL League One runner-up: 2018–19

References

External links

England profile at The Football Association

1999 births
Living people
Footballers from Huddersfield
English footballers
Association football defenders
Huddersfield Town A.F.C. players
Bury F.C. players
English Football League players